Minigastrin (also mini gastrin) is a form of gastrin. Its sequence is H-Leu-Glu-Glu-Glu-Glu-Glu-Ala-Tyr-Gly-Trp-Met-Asp-Phe-NH2.

Minigastrin has shown to be a potential therapeutic agent for thyroid carcinoma by targeting cancer-promoting cholecystokinin receptors.
A 2018 study further elaborates by using radiochemical labeling to show that Indium-111 labeled minigastrin peptides showing to have stronger affinity to cholecystokinin B receptors (CCK2) in neuroendocrine cancers.

Biological Applications 
Peptide Receptor Radionuclide Therapy (PRRT) 

A radioactively labeled analogue of minigastrin, PP-F11, conjugated with NOTA, DOTA, or NODAGA was studied to view the effects they have on peptide receptor radionuclide therapy (PRRT) and cancer cell tracing. When mice with CCK2 tumors were injected with 64Cu-labeled DOTA-PP-F11, NOTA-PP-F11, and NODAGA-PP-F11, the mice labeled with NOTA displayed a tumor uptake o 7.20 ± 0.44% ID/g and a high tumor-to-blood ratio. Further studies are being investigated on how to reduce the background levels to obtain clearer images.

Increasing Tumor Uptake

The inhibition of rapamycin complex 1 was discovered to improve the tumor uptake of radioactively labeled minigastrin. In a study conducted in 2021, treatment of A431/CCKBR tumor cells were assessed with DOTA-PP-F11N. This treatment in combination with RAD001 in mice, resulted in an average size tumor reduction of about 0.3 cm³ in comparison to the control group which had an average tumor size of 0.97 cm³. The treatment group also had a higher survival rate where the control group median life span was 19.5 days and the group that received treatment had an average life span of 43 days.

References

Peptide hormones